Dischistocalyx is a genus of flowering plants belonging to the family Acanthaceae.

Its native range is Southern Nigeria to Western Central Tropical Africa.

Species:

Dischistocalyx alternifolius 
Dischistocalyx champluvieranus 
Dischistocalyx epiphytica 
Dischistocalyx grandifolius 
Dischistocalyx hirsutus 
Dischistocalyx klainei 
Dischistocalyx lithicola 
Dischistocalyx minimus 
Dischistocalyx obanensis 
Dischistocalyx rivularis 
Dischistocalyx strobilinus 
Dischistocalyx thunbergiiflora

References

Acanthaceae
Acanthaceae genera